People's Commissariat for Agriculture ( - Narkomzem) was set up in Petrograd in October 1917. Vladimir Milyutin was appointed the first People's Commissar of Agriculture. He was a member of the Council of People's Commissars (Sovnarkom).

The Narkomzem offices located at Orlikov Pereulok, 1, Moscow were designed by Aleksey Shchusev in 1928. This building is currently occupied by the Ministry of Agriculture of the Russian Federation.

Following the establishment of Sovnarkom at the Second All-Russian Congress of Workers' and Soldiers' Deputies' Soviets Lenin attended the Extraordinary All-Russia Congress Of Soviets Of Peasants' Deputies where he promised that the Left Socialist Revolutionaries could select one of their members to become the Narkomsem Commissar. Andrei Kolegayev was appointed to this position on 23 December 1917.

In 1946 the Commissariat was replaced by the Ministry of Agriculture and Food.

People's Commissars of Agriculture

See also
Ministry of Agriculture (Russia)

References

External links
The Governments of  the Union of Soviet Socialist Republics   1917-1964
Video and photos of Alexey Schusev's Constructivist Narkomzem building at Housing.com

People's
Agriculture in the Soviet Union